, a shortened form of , is a style of elaborately arranged bento (Japanese boxed lunch) which features food decorated to look like people, characters from popular media, animals, and plants. Japanese homemakers often spend time devising their families' meals, including their boxed lunches.

Originally, a decorated bento was intended to interest children in their food and to encourage a wider range of eating habits.  It has now evolved into a cultural symbol, to the point where national contests are held.

In popular culture 
Kyaraben lunchboxes are a major plot element in Bento Monogatari, a 2010 short film by Belgian director Pieter Dirkx.

See also
Ekiben
Makunouchi

References

External links

Face Food: The Visual Creativity of Charaben (and Other Food)

Bento